Hsieh Cheng-peng and Christopher Rungkat were the defending champions but only Rungkat chose to defend his title, partnering Ruben Gonzales. Rungkat lost in the quarterfinals to Marc Polmans and Max Purcell.

Polmans and Purcell won the title after defeating Nam Ji-sung and Song Min-kyu 6–7(5–7), 6–2, [12–10] in the final.

Seeds

Draw

References

External links
 Main draw

Busan Open - Doubles
2022 Doubles